The Internal Macedonian Revolutionary Organization (United) (1925–1936) (Bulgarian: Вътрешна македонска революционна организация - обединена, Vatreshna makedonska revolyucionna organizatsiya - Obedinena; Macedonian: Внатрешна македонска револуционерна организација (обединета), Vnatrešna makedonska revolucionerna organizacija (obedineta)), commonly known in English as IMRO (United), was the name of a revolutionary political organization active across the entire geographical region of Macedonia.

History
IMRO (United) was founded in 1925 in Vienna after the failure of the May Manifesto by the left wing of the Internal Macedonian Revolutionary Organization (IMRO). It was under the leadership of several Bulgarians as Dimitar Vlahov, Pavel Shatev, Georgi Zankov, Rizo Rizov, Vladimir Poptomov, Metodi Shatorov and Hristo Yankov. Its main objective was to free Macedonia within its geographical and economical borders, and to create a new political entity which would become an equal member of the future Balkan Federative Republic. It was accepted as a partner in the Balkan Communist Federation and was sponsored directly by the Comintern, maintaining close links with the Bulgarian communist leader Georgi Dimitrov. He, as secret agent of GRU was responsible especially for the contacts with the IMRO (United).

By the 1930s, IMRO (United) endorsed Macedonism. The Resolution of the Comintern publicly acknowledged the existence of the Macedonian nation and Macedonian language, although published as a resolution of the Internal Macedonian Revolutionary Organization (United), was undoubtedly the most significant international acknowledgement of the Macedonian national individuality, which had very favorable consequences for its development and affirmation. The text of this historic document was prepared in the period between December 20, 1933, and January 7, 1934, by the Balkan Secretariat of the Comintern. It was accepted by the Political Secretariat in Moscow on January 11, 1934, and approved by the Executive Committee of the Comintern. It was published for the first time in the April issue of Makedonsko Delo under the title "The Situation in Macedonia and the Tasks of IMRO (United)". After replying to those who, even within the progressive movement, denied the existence of a separate Macedonian nation, the Resolution, among other things, stated:  "...The bourgeoisie of the ruling nations in the three imperialist states among which Macedonia is partitioned, tries to camouflage its national oppression, denying the national features of the Macedonian people and the existence of the Macedonian nation.".By 1935, the IMRO (United) organisation in Greece was working closely with the Communist Party of Greece (KKE). Indeed, on 3 July 1935, the KKE newspaper, Rizospastis, reported a statement issued by the IMRO (United) organisation in Edesa (Voden) and signed by G. Slavos:  "...We Macedonians also insist on not being called Bulgarians, for we are neither Bulgarians, nor Serbs, nor Greeks, but Macedonians. We invite all Macedonians to join the ranks of the IMRO (United), and all of us together will fight for a free Macedonia..."  Later, IMRO (United) members were put on trial due to suspected illegal political activity. Many members listed their nationality as Macedonian. Until its dissolution in 1936 it sought to act as part of a Bulgarian Communist Party, Communist Party of Yugoslavia and the Communist Party of Greece and in fact attempted to play the part of a Communist-led Macedonian national or popular front. After the organization was dissolved, most of the members ended up joining the Bulgarian Communist Party. During its existence, the organization had little influence over the Macedonian population.

Sources

 VMRO (obedineta), vol. I, p. 131 Skopje 1991
 Andrew Rossos. The Macedonians of Aegean Macedonia: A British officer's report, 1944.

Notes

External links
Makedonsko Delo - VMRO-United newspaper.

 
Macedonia, Internal Macedonian Revolutionary Organization (United)
Modern history of Macedonia (region)
Defunct organizations based in Bulgaria
Internal Macedonian Revolutionary Organization
Regionalist parties